Hiernia is a monotypic genus of flowering plants belonging to the family Orobanchaceae. It only contains one species, Hiernia angolensis S.Moore 

Its native range is Angola and Namibia.

The genus name of Hiernia is in honour of William Philip Hiern (1839–1925), a British mathematician and botanist. The Latin specific epithet of angolensis refers to coming from Angola.
It was first described and published in J. Bot. Vol.18 on page 196 in 1880.

References

Orobanchaceae
Orobanchaceae genera
Plants described in 1880
Flora of Angola
Flora of Namibia